(–)-camphene synthase (EC 4.2.3.117, CS) is an enzyme with systematic name geranyl-diphosphate diphosphate-lyase [cyclizing, (–)-camphene-forming]. This enzyme catalyses the following chemical reaction

 geranyl diphosphate  (–)-camphene + diphosphate

(–)-Camphene is the major product in Abies grandis (grand fir) with traces of other monoterpenoids.

References

External links 
 

EC 4.2.3